Jamie Twist Schroeder (born September 9, 1981, in Wilmette, Illinois) is an American rower, and a victorious Oxford Blue.

Education
Schroeder was educated at Choate Rosemary Hall, Connecticut '99, and Stanford University '05 from where she has a BSc in biology and an MSc in bioengineering. She originally enrolled at Northwestern University, where she began rowing in 2001 before transferring to Stanford. She matriculated in 2005 at Christ Church, Oxford where she studied cardiac energetics and earned a doctoral degree in 2010 from the Department of Physiology, Anatomy, and Genetics.

The Boat Race
At Oxford University, Schroeder was a member of Oxford University Boat Club and took part in the Boat Race in 2006. Both universities had extremely strong intakes that year, with Cambridge boasting several world champions and the Oxford crew including Olympic silver medallists Barney Williams and Jake Wetzel. Oxford, with Schroeder in the five seat, won the epic contest by 5 lengths in a time of 18 minutes 26 seconds.

International rowing career
Schroeder won her first senior international vest in 2003 sitting in the three seat of the United States Coxless Four, which came 7th at the World Championships in Seville. She occupied the two seat a year later when the Four came 10th at the Olympics in Athens. After taking a break from international rowing, Schroeder competed in the single scull at the World Championships at Dorney Lake, Eton, finishing 12th. In preparation for the 2008 Beijing Olympics, the US quadruple scull first competed in the 2008 World Cup in Lucerne, Switzerland. The quad, with Schroeder in the three seat, overcame the 3-year undefeated World Champion Polish quad to win a gold medal, marking the first time the US has had international success in the quadruple sculls event. Keeping the same lineup from the gold-medal World Cup boat, Schroeder and teammates Scott Gault, Sam Stitt, and Matt Hughes went on to place 5th at the 2008 Beijing Olympics later in the summer.

Achievements

Olympics
 2008 Beijing - 5th, Quad Scull (three)
 2004 Athens - 10th, Coxless Four (two)

World Championships
 2007 Munich - 9th, Quad Scull (three)
 2006 Eton - 12th, Single Scull
 2003 Milan - 7th, Coxless Four (three)

World Cup
 2008 Lucerne - GOLD, Quad Scull (three)

Other rowing

In the summers of 2006 and 2009, Schroeder competed for Christ Church in one of Oxford's annual inter-collegiate competitions, Summer Eights. In 2006, Christ Church - stroked by Schroeder - rose one place in the bumps charts to fourth. In 2009, the crew, with Schroeder at five, started third, but "bumped" on the first two days of the competition, and finished "Head of the River" for the first time since 1985.

References

External links
USRowing Bio
 Stanford Press Release
 The Boat Race Bio
 "Making Waves" - Baltimore Sun
 "Oars In the Water" - Chicago Tribune
 "Tuba Player Stoked by the Stroke" - San Francisco Chronicle

1981 births
Living people
Stanford University alumni
Stanford Cardinal rowers
Rowers at the 2004 Summer Olympics
Rowers at the 2007 Pan American Games
Rowers at the 2008 Summer Olympics
Olympic rowers of the United States
Oxford University Boat Club rowers
Pan American Games medalists in rowing
Pan American Games bronze medalists for the United States
American male rowers
Medalists at the 2007 Pan American Games